Florence Avril Angers (18 April 1918 – 9 November 2005) was an English stand-up comedian and actress. The Daily Telegraph described her as "one of the most zestful, charming and reliable character comediennes in the postwar London theatre".

Life
Angers was born in Liverpool, Lancashire in 1918. Her father, Harry Angers, was a music hall comedian who also appeared in films in the 1930s and 1940s. She was a dancer with the Tiller Girls before joining ENSA during the Second World War. She never married or had children. Angers lived in Covent Garden, London, where she died from pneumonia, aged 87.

Career
She made her West End theatre debut at the Palace Theatre in a 1944 revue titled Keep Going. One of the early stand-up comediennes, she was capable of playing a straight man role as a foil to established male comics such as Frankie Howerd and Arthur Askey.

Along with Terry-Thomas, she was one of the original cast of British television's first ever comedy series How Do You View? in 1949.

In 1961, she played Norah Dawson in Coronation Street, who was Arnold Tanner's new fiancée ('Madame Toffee Shop' as Elsie Tanner called her).

After five years' service with ENSA, she returned to civilian life and took on many and various roles in television (including Dad's Army, All Creatures Great and Small, Are You Being Served? and Odd Man Out), as well as in film and theatre. These included playing Miss Marple in Agatha Christie's Murder at the Vicarage at the Savoy Theatre in 1976 in the West End.

One of her best remembered roles was that of Hayley Mills's shrewish mother in the film version of Bill Naughton's play The Family Way (1966). A still from the film featuring Angers features as the cover of The Smiths' single "I Started Something I Couldn't Finish" (1987).

Vocal work
In 1958, she, Roger Livesey, Terry-Thomas, Rita Webb, Judith Furse, and Miles Malleson, recorded 'Indian Summer of an Uncle', and 'Jeeves Takes Charge' for the Caedmon Audio record label, (Caedmon Audio TC-1137). It was released in stereo in 1964.

Partial filmography
 Brass Monkey (1948) – Herself
 Miss Pilgrim's Progress (1949) – First Factory Girl
 The Six Men (1951) – Herself
 Don't Blame the Stork – Renee O'Connor 
 Women Without Men (1956) – Bessie
 Bond of Fear (1956) – Girl Hiker
 The Green Man (1956) – Marigold
 Coronation Street (1961) – Norah Dawson
 Be My Guest (1965) – Mrs Pucil
 Devils of Darkness (1965) – Midge
 The Family Way (1966) – Liz Piper
 Three Bites of the Apple (1967) – Gladys Tomlinson
 Two a Penny (1967) – Mrs Burry
 The Best House in London (1969) – Flora's Mother
 Staircase (1969) – Miss Ricard
 There's a Girl in My Soup (1970) – English Tourist in Lift
 Mr. Forbush and the Penguins (1971) – Fanny Hill
 Confessions of a Driving Instructor (1976) – Mrs Truscott
 Victoria Wood – Episode 5: "Val de Ree (Ha Ha Ha Ha Ha)" (1989) – Mim

References

External links
 

1918 births
2005 deaths
Deaths from pneumonia in England
English film actresses
English television actresses
Actresses from Liverpool
Comedians from Liverpool
English women comedians
20th-century English actresses
20th-century English comedians
20th-century British businesspeople